Uzma Iftikhar (born 4 February 1987) is a Pakistani-born American cricketer. She made her Women's Twenty20 International (WT20I) debut for the United States women's cricket team on 17 May 2019, against Canada, in the 2019 ICC Women's Qualifier Americas tournament.

In August 2019, she was named in United States' squad for the 2019 ICC Women's World Twenty20 Qualifier tournament in Scotland. She played in the group-stage match between the United States and Papua New Guinea on 3 September 2019.

In February 2021, she was named in the Women's National Training Group by the USA Cricket Women's National Selectors ahead of the 2021 Women's Cricket World Cup Qualifier and the 2021 ICC Women's T20 World Cup Americas Qualifier tournaments. In September 2021, she was named in the American team for the World Cup Qualifier tournament. In October 2021, she was named in the American team for the 2021 Women's Cricket World Cup Qualifier tournament in Zimbabwe.

References

External links
 

1987 births
Living people
Cricketers from Karachi
Pakistani emigrants to the United States
American sportspeople of Pakistani descent
American women cricketers
United States women Twenty20 International cricketers
Place of birth missing (living people)
21st-century American women